Magas-hegy is a 1,268 ft / 514 m mountain peak near Sátoraljaújhely, Borsod-Abaúj-Zemplén, Hungary. Based on peakery data, it ranks as the 219th highest mountain in Hungary. It is part of the Zemplén Mountains or Tokaj Mountains (Hungarian: Zempléni-hegység or Tokaji-hegység).

Name
Magas-hegy means High Mountain in Hungarian

Origin
The Zemplén Mountains are of volcanic origin; the soil's high quality favours viticulture.

External links
Zemplen Kalandpark

References

Mountains of Hungary